The International Documentary Association produced in 2007 a list of the top 25 documentary films as voted by members.

List
 Hoop Dreams (1994)
 The Thin Blue Line (1988)
 Bowling for Columbine (2002)
 Spellbound (2002)
 Harlan County, U.S.A. (1976)
 An Inconvenient Truth (2006)
 Crumb (1994)
 Gimme Shelter (1970)
 The Fog of War (2003)
 Roger & Me (1989)
 Super Size Me (2004)
 Dont Look Back (1967)
 Salesman (1968)
 Koyaanisqatsi (1983)
 Sherman's March (1986)
 Grey Gardens (1976)
 Capturing the Friedmans (2003)
 Born into Brothels (2004)
 Titicut Follies (1967)
 Buena Vista Social Club (1999)
 Fahrenheit 9/11 (2004)
 Winged Migration (2002)
 Grizzly Man (2005)
 Night and Fog (1955)
 Woodstock (1970)
International Documentary Association Releases List of Top 25 Documentaries - Film Junk

StatisticsNight and Fog is the oldest and shortest entry on the list while An Inconvenient Truth is the most recent as of 2022.

Six Academy Award for Best Documentary Feature winners are featured on the list: Bowling for Columbine, Harlan County, U.S.A., An Inconvenient Truth, The Fog of War, Born into Brothels and Woodstock. 

Michael Moore, Errol Morris and The Maysles Brothers have multiple entries on the list.

See also
 50 Documentaries to See Before You Die
 List of films considered the bestDocumentary Now''-Emmy-nominated mockumentary series parodying some of the documentary films featured on the list

References

External links
The official list on IndieWire

Top film lists

2007 in film